The Mutation is a 2021 British horror film directed by Scott Jeffrey, starring Ricardo Freitas, Amanda-Jade Tyler, Abi Casson Thompson, James Robertson and Derek Nelson.

Cast
 Ricardo Freitas as Allen Marsh
 Amanda-Jade Tyler as Dr. Linda Rowe
 Abi Casson Thompson as Julie Smith
 James Robertson as Norton
 Derek Nelson as Rat
 Megan Purvis as Sergeant Chambers
 Sarah T. Cohen as Tara
 Andrew Rolfe as Sargent McKenna
 Allis Smith by Monica
 Zoe Purdy as Hannah
 Jodie Benett as Jenna
 Kathi DeCuoto as Tina
 Brendan Jones as Rob

Release
The film was released to digital and DVD on 5 October 2021.

Reception
Phil Wheat of Nerdly rated the film 4 stars out of 5, writing that "It’s nothing groundbreaking, but it’s enjoyable". Janel Spiegel of HorrorNews.net wrote a positive review of the film, writing that it is "a fun movie to watch", and that it "definitely takes you on a ride with a wild creature."

References

External links
 
 

British horror films
2021 horror films